Joan Sione (born 30 January 1986) is a female rugby union player. She represented  and Auckland.

Biography 
Sione made her international debut against Scotland on 29 June 2005 at Ottawa. Sione was a member of the 2010 Women's Rugby World Cup winning squad. She scored the winning try that sealed the Black Ferns a finals place.

References

External links
Black Ferns Profile

1986 births
Living people
New Zealand women's international rugby union players
New Zealand female rugby union players
Female rugby union players